Nahuja is a small village in the Cerdanya which is part of the Pyrénées-Orientales department in southern France. It is only 8 km far from the Spanish border in Puigcerdà. Its closest neighbour towns are Osséja and Sainte-Léocadie.

Geography 
Nahuja is located in the canton of Les Pyrénées catalanes and in the arrondissement of Prades.

Population

See also
Communes of the Pyrénées-Orientales department
Hiking around Nahuja

References

Communes of Pyrénées-Orientales